Dětřichov is a municipality and village in Liberec District in the Liberec Region of the Czech Republic. It has about 700 inhabitants.

History
The first written mention of Dětřichov is from 1381.

References

External links

Villages in Liberec District